Anatemnus seychellesensis is a species of pseudoscorpions that is endemic to the Seychelles, and is known from a single specimen from Silhouette Island. It is threatened by habitat degradation from invasive plants and coastal development.

References

Atemnidae
Cheliferoidea
Endangered animals
Endemic fauna of Seychelles
Animals described in 1940